Roselord Borgella (born 1 April 1993) is a Haitian footballer who plays as a forward for French Division 1 Féminine club Dijon FCO and the Haiti women's national team.

International goals
Scores and results list Haiti's goal tally first

References

External links 
 
 https://www.santiagomorning.cl/femenino.html

1993 births
Living people
Women's association football forwards
Women's association football midfielders
Women's association football central defenders
Women's association football fullbacks
Haitian women's footballers
People from Ouest (department)
Haiti women's international footballers
Competitors at the 2014 Central American and Caribbean Games
F.C. Indiana players
Santiago Morning (women) footballers
Haitian expatriate footballers
Haitian expatriate sportspeople in the United States
Expatriate women's soccer players in the United States
Haitian expatriate sportspeople in South Korea
Expatriate women's footballers in South Korea
Haitian expatriate sportspeople in Chile
Expatriate women's footballers in Chile
GPSO 92 Issy players